Broken Bridges is a 2006 film starring Toby Keith, Lindsey Haun, Burt Reynolds and Kelly Preston. The film, a music-drama, is centered on a fading country singer's return to his hometown near a military base in Tennessee where several young men who were killed in a training exercise on the base were from. He is reunited with his former sweetheart and estranged daughter, who returns to the town as well.

Plot

Bo Price (Keith), a down-and-out country singer, has returned home for his brother's funeral following a military training accident.  While there, he reunites with his true love, Angela Delton (Preston), a Miami news reporter who has also returned home for her brother's funeral.  Bo also meets their 16-year-old daughter, Dixie Leigh Delton (Haun), for the first time. Since Bo walked away from Angela while she was still pregnant, Dixie has never met him or his side of the family.  Dixie has experimented with alcohol, but is able to break free with the help of her now-sober father.  With her father's musical blood running through her veins, Dixie closes the movie by singing a song she wrote at the memorial for the fallen soldiers.

Cast
 Toby Keith as Bo Price
 Kelly Preston as Angela "Angel" Delton
 Lindsey Haun as Dixie Leigh Delton
 Tess Harper as Dixie Rose Delton
 Burt Reynolds as Jake Delton
 Willie Nelson as himself
 BeBe Winans as himself
 Seth Chalmers as Jerome
 Josh Henderson as Wyatt
 Anna Maria Horsford as Loretta

Reception

Box office
The film had a poor box office gross of  $252,539 in four weeks of release. The film has sold over $8 million in DVD sales, and repeated often on CMT, Country Music Television.

Critical response
On Rotten Tomatoes the film has an approval rating of 5% based on reviews from 21 critics. 
On Metacritic it has a score of 32% based on reviews from 7 critics.
Most critics cited Toby Keith's wooden acting, as well as the blatant product placement by Keith's sponsor, Ford, as major detriments to the film.

Joe Leydon of Variety wrote: "It's obviously intended as a star vehicle, but Broken Bridges turns out to be a rattletrap jalopy for country music performer Toby Keith."
Maitland McDonagh of TV Guide gave it 2 out of 4 and wrote: "The Country Music Channel's first foray into feature filmmaking is sickly sweet and thoroughly predictable."

Soundtrack

The movie's soundtrack was released on August 29, 2006 via Show Dog Nashville (now Show Dog-Universal Music). It features songs by Keith, Haun, and various other artists. Keith's own "Crash Here Tonight", appearing on both the soundtrack and his 2006 album White Trash with Money, was released as a single.

References

External links
 Official Website
 
 

2006 films
Country music films
Paramount Vantage films
American drama films
2006 drama films
Films shot in Atlanta
2000s English-language films
2000s American films